Albert Ezra Kay (14 May 1877 – 23 October 1960) was an Australian rules footballer who played for the St Kilda Football Club in the Victorian Football League (VFL).

References

External links 

1877 births
1960 deaths
Australian rules footballers from Victoria (Australia)
St Kilda Football Club players
People from Creswick, Victoria